The Cooleemee Cards were a Minor League Baseball team, based in Cooleemee, North Carolina, United States, that operated in the North Carolina State League between 1937 and 1941.

They were known as the Cooleemee Weavers in 1937 and 1938 and the Cooleemee Cools in 1939 before becoming an affiliate of the St. Louis Cardinals in 1940.

Year-by-year record

References

External links
Cooleemee, North Carolina baseball reference
Baseball in North Carolina book
Book about North Carolina baseball league

Defunct minor league baseball teams
Brooklyn Dodgers minor league affiliates
St. Louis Cardinals minor league affiliates
Professional baseball teams in North Carolina
Defunct baseball teams in North Carolina
Baseball teams disestablished in 1941
Baseball teams established in 1937